SS Midland City was originally a Canadian side-wheel steamboat that provided passenger and cargo transportation on the Great Lakes from 1871 until 1955. Originally named Maud, then America, she underwent several extensive refits over her 84-year service, and saw several owners. The ship was intentionally run aground and burnt to the waterline in 1955 near the mouth of the Wye River in Midland Bay. The wreck is intact and visible above the water to this day, where it acts as a breakwater for the Wye Heritage Marina and local attraction.

History

Maud
Midland City was originally built as a ferry named Maud (occasionally Maude). Her tonnage was variously stated as between 120 and 133 tons reg. (293 tons gross). She was built with a steel-reinforced timber hull over an iron frame. Her capacity is listed as 550 passengers.

Assembled by the Gildersleeves (a shipbuilding family and political dynasty) and completed August 1871, Maud was originally intended to provide passenger and cargo service between Picton and Belleville, Ontario under the command of Captain W. Swales. She was valued at $20,000 and sold to a W. Nickle, Esq. of Kingston in January 1873. Both Swales and Nickle (or Nichol) were involved in the construction of the ship, according to a report from the day of her launch.

America
In 1886, the vessel was sold to the St. Lawrence River Steamboats Co. of Kingston. In 1895 she was refitted and enlarged, now 153 feet long, 35 feet in breadth and 266 tons (521 tons gross). Re-named America, she provided passenger service on Lake Ontario for many years before being refitted again in 1921, and once more in 1933.

Georgian Bay Tourist Company
After the close of the 1920 navigation season, Northern Navigation Company announced they intended to discontinue their steamship service between Midland and Parry Sound, leaving Midland businessmen to find a replacement for the popular excursion steamer route. To deal with the tourist traffic in the southern Georgian Bay region, the Georgian Bay Tourist Company and the Honey Harbour Navigation Company were organized. The original intention of the company was to have a ship capable of carrying 400 passengers to leave Midland daily, on the arrival of a new G.T.R. train, running to San Souci and returning to Midland the next day, connecting with the train. The Grand Trunk Railway company was brought on board with the plan. A second steamboat was required to convey passengers among the Honey Harbour Islands.

Midland City

America was renamed SS Midland City in 1921, before a 1922 rebuild in Kingston that saw her weight increase to 580 tons gross. Among the changes made during this refit was the installation of a bay to carry two cars. She was then brought to Georgian Bay where the steamer ran a regular route from Midland to Parry Sound, stopping in Honey Harbour, Minnicog, Whalen's, Go-Home-Bay, Wah-Wah-Taysee, Manitou, Copperhead, Sans Souci, and Rose Point.

The 1933 refit was the most extensive, replacing the steam engine with a new 300 hp diesel motor. She was accidentally beached at Watcher's Reef on 26 August 1934, but suffered no damage. The ship continued to act as a ferry on Georgian Bay until 1955.

Wreck
In 1955, Midland Citys 84th year afloat, she was intentionally grounded at the mouth of the Wye River, where the Wye Marsh empties into Midland Bay. The ship was intentionally burned.

The wreck served as a local attraction for snorkeling and diving before eventually being filled and connected to the shore, forming a breakwater for an entrance to the Wye Heritage Marina. Though lowering water levels in Georgian Bay have since exposed part of the wooden sides of the ship, it has slowly been forgotten, and few locals remember its presence.

Today the wreck is clearly visible from satellite imagery, as a short pier pointing to the Northwest immediately North of the Wye Heritage Marina. The shape of her stern is immediately apparent, while her bow is concealed by the boulders connecting the breakwater to shore. While covered by vegetation and filled with rocks, the hull is relatively intact. Debris can be seen in a long trail on the lake bottom where the ship was run aground.

References

 

Steamships of Canada
1871 ships
Ships built in Scotland
Maritime incidents in 1934
Maritime incidents in 1955
Shipwrecks of Canada
Shipwrecks of Lake Huron
Ferries of Ontario